Panama and the United States cooperate in promoting economic, political, security, and social development through international agencies. 

According to the 2012 U.S. Global Leadership Report, 32% of Panamanian people approve of U.S. leadership, with 16% disapproving and 52% uncertain.

Overview

19th century

Panama
President James Polk's ambassador to the Republic of New Granada, Benjamin Alden Bidlack, negotiated the Mallarino–Bidlack Treaty with the government of New Granada in 1846. Though Bidlack had initially only sought to remove tariffs on American goods, Bidlack and New Granadan Foreign Minister Manuel María Mallarino negotiated a broader agreement that deepened military and trade ties between the two countries. The treaty also allowed for the construction of the Panama Railway. In an era of slow overland travel, the treaty gave the United States a route to more rapidly travel between its eastern and western coasts. In exchange, Washington guaranteed New Granada's sovereignty over the Isthmus of Panama. The treaty won ratification in both countries in 1848. The agreement helped to establish a stronger American influence in the region, as the Polk administration sought to ensure that Great Britain would not dominate Central America. The United States would use the Mallarino-Bidlack Treaty as justification for numerous military interventions in Panama.

Independence of Panama and US intervention
The United States first attempted to acquire control of a canal on the Panamanian isthmus via the Hay-Herran Treaty of 1903, but the treaty was not ratified. Desperate to construct a canal, the United States saw the separatist movement as an opportunity. Despite the Bidlack-Mallarino Treaty of 1846 in which the United States would intervene in the event of a disorder between Panama and Colombia in Colombia's favor, the United States prevented Colombian forces from moving across the isthmus to stop the Panamanian uprising. On November 4, 1903, the immediate support of the USA secured the Declaration of Independence of Panama from Colombia. In return, Panama signed the Hay–Bunau-Varilla Treaty three weeks later, granting the USA sovereign rights over the interoceanic canal that would be built over the following decade.

Relations during the 20th century
The evolution of the relation between Panama and the USA has followed the pattern of a Panamanian project for the recovering of the territory of the Canal of Panama, a project which became public after the events of May 21, 1958, November 3, 1959, and then on January 9, 1964. The latter day is known in Panama as the Martyrs' Day (Panama), in which a riot over the right to raise the Panamanian flag in an American school became the vicinity of the Panama Canal.

The following years saw a lengthy negotiation process with the United States, culminating with the Torrijos–Carter Treaties, in which the transfer of the Panama Canal to Panama was set to be completed in December, 1999. The process of transition, however, was made difficult by the existence of the de facto military rule of Manuel Noriega in Panama from 1982 to 1989.

The 1977 Panama Canal Treaties entered into force on October 1, 1979. They replaced the 1903 Hay–Bunau-Varilla Treaty between the United States and Panama (modified in 1936 and 1955), and all other U.S.-Panama agreements concerning the Panama Canal, which were in force on that date. The treaties comprise a basic treaty governing the operation and defense of the Canal from October 1, 1979 to December 31, 1999 (Panama Canal Treaty) and a treaty guaranteeing the permanent neutrality of the Canal (Neutrality Treaty).

The details of the arrangements for U.S. operation and defense of the Canal under the Panama Canal Treaty are spelled out in separate implementing agreements. The Canal Zone and its government ceased to exist when the treaties entered into force and Panama assumed complete jurisdiction over Canal Zone territories and functions, a process which was finalized on December 31, 1999.

United States invasion of Panama

On December 20, 1989, in order to arrest Manuel Noriega, the United States invaded Panama. The military intervention helped to swear into power the winners of the elections of May 1989, President Guillermo Endara.

The History of the Relations between Panama and the USA are a mandatory course in the curriculum of Public High School in Panama.

Recent history
The United States cooperates with the Panamanian government in promoting economic, political, security, and social development through U.S. and international agencies. Cultural ties between the two countries are strong and many Panamanians go to the United States for higher education and advanced training. In 2007, the U.S. and Panama partnered to launch a regional health worker training center. The center provides training to community healthcare workers in Panama and throughout Central America. About 25,000 American citizens reside in Panama, many are retirees from the Panama Canal Commission and individuals who hold dual nationality. There is also a rapidly growing enclave of American retirees in the Chiriquí Province in western Panama.

Panama continues to fight against the illegal narcotics and arms trade. The country's proximity to major cocaine-producing nations and its role as a commercial and financial crossroads make it a country of special importance in this regard. The Panamanian Government has concluded agreements with the U.S. on maritime law enforcement, counter-terrorism, counter-narcotics, and stolen vehicles. A three-year investigation by the Drug Prosecutors Office (DPO), the PTJ, and several other law enforcement agencies in the region culminated in the May 2006 arrest in Brazil of Pablo Rayo Montano, a Colombian-born drug crime boss. Assets located in Panama belonging to his drug cartel were among those seized by the Government of Panama following his indictment by a U.S. federal court in Miami. In March 2007, the United States Coast Guard, in cooperation with the Government of Panama, seized over 38,000 lbs. of cocaine off the coast of Panama, the largest drug seizure in the eastern Pacific. Panama signed the Lima Declaration, which has been signed by multiple Latin American countries. The document is a collective rejection of Venezuela's Constituent Assembly and identifies president Maduro of Venezuela as a dictator. In the beginning of August 2017, Vice President Pence visited Panama City, Panama to give a joint statement with President Varela regarding the two countries joint efforts to restore democracy in Venezuela, but more importantly reflect on the relationship between the two countries.

In the economic investment arena, the Panamanian government has been successful in the enforcement of intellectual property rights as well as has concluded a Bilateral Investment Treaty Amendment with the United States and an agreement with the Overseas Private Investment Corporation. Although money laundering remains a problem, Panama passed significant reforms in 2000 intended to strengthen its cooperation against international financial crimes.

In January 2005, Panama sent election supervisors to Iraq as part of the International Mission for Iraqi Elections to monitor the national elections.

In 2015, former Panamanian president Ricardo Martinelli fled to the United States and asked for asylum. Despite a Panamanian request for extradition on wiretapping charges, Martinelli was only arrested in June 2017 and extradited in June 2018. The delay caused critics in Panama to question about American interference. The United States also worked against improving relations between Panama and China. When a Chinese container ship became the first ship to pass through the new Panama Canal locks in June 2016, US Ambassador John D. Feeley arranged for a US Navy ship to be stationed in view of the Chinese ship. While Feeley expressed concerns about Panamanian plans to establish diplomatic relations with China, Panamanian President Juan Carlos Varela denied that anything was happening. Negotiations were held in Madrid and Beijing to escape surveillance by the US Embassy, and the US Ambassador was only told one hour before the public announcement. Ambassador Feeley also persuaded Panama's Security Ministry to deny the Chinese company Huawei a contract for communications technology, which was handed to the US company General Dynamics.

Principal U.S. Embassy Officials
 Chargé d'Affaires ad interim – Stewart Tuttle

Diplomatic missions

The U.S. Embassy in Panama is in Panama City, Panama. In 1938, the site in Avenida Balboa was leased from the Government of Panama for 99 years. The chancery building was constructed under the supervision of the Foreign Buildings Office of the Department of State in 1941. The total cost of the land and construction was $366,719. The first diplomatic mission of the United States of America in the Republic of Panama was established in 1904, the year after Panama achieved independence from Colombia on November 3, 1903. The first American Minister was William L. Buchanan of Covington, Ohio. For many years, The American Legation was for many years located at the corner of Central Avenue and Fourth Street. It was raised to Diplomatic mission status in 1939 and moved to its current location on April 2, 1942. The United States first established a consular office in Panama in 1823 when Panama was a department of Colombia. It became a Consulate General on September 3, 1884 and was combined with the Embassy on April 6, 1942. Earliest available records of the Consulate date from 1910 when the consulate was located in the Diario de Panama Building near the Presidential Palace. It was then moved to the Marina Building across from the Presidential Palace. It subsequently moved to several other buildings in Panama City, before coming to its current location in Building 783, Clayton.  There is also a virtual post in Colon.

Panama maintains an embassy in Washington.

See also
Panamanian Americans
List of ambassadors of the United States to Panama
Panama Canal

References

Further reading

 Conniff, Michael L. Panama and the United States: the End of the Alliance (University of Georgia Press, 2012) online
 Cordoba, Gabriel Fuentes. "The impact of the Panama Canal transfer on the Panamanian economy." Economics Letters 211 (2022): 110208.

 Dean, Rosetta Sharp. "Panamanian Americans." Gale Encyclopedia of Multicultural America, edited by Thomas Riggs, (3rd ed., vol. 3, Gale, 2014), pp. 449–457. online
 Dolan, Edward F. Panama and the United States: Their Canal, Their Stormy Years (1990).
 Ealy, Lawrence O. The Republic of Panama in world affairs, 1903-1950 (U of Pennsylvania Press, 1951). online
 Farnsworth, David N., and James W. McKenney. US-Panama relations, 1903–1978: A study in linkage politics (Routledge, 2020).
 Gilboa, Eytan. "The Panama Invasion Revisited: Lessons for the Use of Force in the Post Cold War Era." Political Science Quarterly (1995): 539–562. in JSTOR
 Healy, David. Drive to hegemony: the United States in the Caribbean, 1898-1917 (1988).
 Koster, R. M., and Guillermo Sanchez. In the Time of Tyrants: Panama, 1968-1990 (1990). 
 LaFeber, Walter. The Panama Canal: the crisis in historical perspective (Oxford University Press, 1978) online
 Langley, Lester D. "US-Panamanian Relations since 1941." Journal of Interamerican Studies and World Affairs 12.3 (1970): 339–366.
 Leonard, Thomas M. "United States Perception of Panamanian Politics, 1944-1949." Journal Of Third World Studies 5.2 (1988): 112–138. online
 McCullough, David G. The Path Between the Seas: The Creation of the Panama Canal 1870-1914 (1977). online
 Major, John. Prize Possession: The United States and the Panama Canal, 1903-1979 (1993) online
 Major, John. "‘Pro mundi beneficio’? The Panama Canal as an international issue, 1943–8." Review of International Studies 9.1 (1983): 17-34.

 Maurer, Noel, and Carlos Yu. The big ditch: How America took, built, ran, and ultimately gave away the Panama Canal (Princeton UP, 2010)
 Meditz, Sandra W., and Dennis Michael Hanratty, eds. Panama: a country study (Library of Congress, 1989). online
 Mejía, Germán. The United States Discovers Panama: The Writings of Soldiers, Scholars, Scientists, and Scoundrels, 1850-1905 (2004).
 Musicant, Ivan. The Banana Wars (1990). 
 Ryan, Paul B. ed. The Panama Canal controversy : U.S. diplomacy and defense interests (1977) primary and secondary sources. online
 Sánchez, Peter M. Panama Lost? US Hegemony, Democracy and the Canal (University Press of Florida, 2007), 251 pp, 
 Sánchez, Peter M.  "The end of hegemony? Panama and the United States." International Journal on World Peace (2002): 57–89. in JSTOR

 Shaffer, Kirwin. "Anti-Colonial Awakenings: The Dominican Republic, Puerto Rico, Cuba, and Panama, 1820s–Early 1900s." in A Transnational History of the Modern Caribbean (Palgrave Macmillan, Cham. 2022). https://doi.org/10.1007/978-3-030-93012-7_5
 Sullivan, Mark P. Panama: An Overview (Library of Congress, 2020). online
 Williams Jr, Harold E. Panamanian-US Relations Towards 2000: An Opportunity for Partnership (Naval Postgraduate School, 1995) online.
 Woerner, Fred F. "The Strategic Imperatives for the United States in Latin America." in Uncomfortable Wars (Routledge, 2020) pp. 57-67.

 Yates, Lawrence A. The US Military Intervention in Panama: Operation Just Cause, December 1989-January 1990 (Center of Military History, United States Army, 2014) online.

Sources
 
(This article incorporates text from this source, which is in the public domain.)

 
Bilateral relations of the United States
United States